The following is a list of active missiles of the United States military.

Air-to-air missiles

Air-to-surface missiles

Surface-to-air

Surface-to-surface missiles

Antisubmarine warfare

ICBM

Submarine-launched

See also
Lists of weapons
List of missiles
List of missiles by country

Missiles
Missiles, United States
Missiles
United States